Juliusz Gardan (1901–1944) was a Polish screenwriter and film director.

Selected filmography
Director
 Policmajster Tagiejew (1929)
 Life Sentence (1933)
 Tredowata (1936)
 Halka (1937)
 Wrzos (1938)
 Doktór Murek (1939)

Bibliography
 Skaff, Sheila. The Law of the Looking Glass: Cinema in Poland, 1896-1939. Ohio University Press, 2008.

External links

1901 births
1944 deaths
Polish film directors
People from Częstochowa
20th-century Polish screenwriters
Male screenwriters
20th-century Polish male writers